弐(II), also known as Viva Koenji! and 2 (ni) is the second studio album by the band Kōenji Hyakkei.

Track listing
 "Grembo Zavia" – (10:14)
 "Graddinoba Revoss" – (4:28)
 "Sllina Vezom" – (5:28)
 "Quidom" – (3:43)
 "Aramidda Horva" – (5:53)
 "Brahggo" – (4:48)
 "Cembell Rotta" – (3:42)
 "Rissenddo Rraimb" – (9:17)
 "Guoth Dahha" – (9:25)
 "Pamillazze" – (1:19)

Personnel
Tatsuya Yoshida – drums, keyboards, vocals
Sakamoto Kengo – bass, vocals
Kubota Aki – vocals, keyboards
Harada Jin – guitars, vocals

References

External links
KOENJIHYAKKEI 2 (ni) reviews and MP3 @ progarchives.com retrieved 11-19-07

1997 albums
Kōenji Hyakkei albums